US Post Office-Far Rockaway is a historic post office building located at Far Rockaway in Queens County, New York, United States. It was built in 1935, and is one of six post offices in New York State designed by architect Eric Kebbon as a consultant to the Office of the Supervising Architect.  It is a two-story brick building with limestone trim and a low granite base in the Colonial Revival style.  Its main facade features a centrally placed polygonal shaped frontispiece with a rounded dome inspired by Thomas Jefferson's Monticello.  It also has a grand entrance vestibule.

It was listed on the National Register of Historic Places in 1988.

References

Far Rockaway
Government buildings completed in 1935
Colonial Revival architecture in New York City
Government buildings in Queens, New York
Rockaway, Queens
National Register of Historic Places in Queens, New York